Once Upon Another Time is the fifth EP by American singer-songwriter Sara Bareilles, released on 22 May 2012.

The first single, "Stay", was released on Record Store Day 2012 only on 7" vinyl, accompanied by the vinyl-only B-side "Beautiful Girl".

Commercial performance
Once Upon Another Time debuted at number eight on the US Billboard 200, selling 31,000 copies in its first week. This became Bareilles' third US top-ten debut. In its second week, the album dropped to number 66, its final week in the top 100.

Track listing

Personnel

Musicians
 Sara Bareilles – piano, acoustic and electric guitar, ukulele, synthesizer, harmonium (1), vocals
 Ruby Amanfu – harmony vocals (track 2)
 David Angell – violin (2)
 The Collective – backing vocals (track 2)
 David Jennings
 Daniel Ellsworth
 Rachael Lampa
 Kaleb Jones
 Jonathan Lister
 Apple Mac
 Scott Attrill
 DB7
 Jim Sullivan
 David Davidson – violin (2)
 Sam Farrar – synthesizer, bass guitar, percussion
 Ben Folds – drums, bass guitar, piano, chimes
 Sari Reist – cello (2)
 Leslie Richter – harmony vocals (4)
 Kristin Wilkinson – viola (2)

Production
 Production, arrangement – Ben Folds
 Engineering, mixing – Joe Costa
 Assistant engineering – Leslie Richter
 Mastering – Bob Ludwig

Charts

Weekly charts

References

Once Upon Another Time Piano sheet music

2012 EPs
Sara Bareilles EPs
Epic Records EPs
Albums produced by Ben Folds